East Lawrencetown (44.70227, -63.34439) is a rural community within Halifax Regional Municipality in Nova Scotia, Canada on the Eastern Shore on Route 207 along the scenic route  Marine Drive. The community is 22.4 kilometers from Halifax. Lawrencetown Beach Provincial Park is located in the community, at the southern end of Lawrencetown Lake, a natural ocean inlet.
The beach is a year-round destination for surfing, attracting both locals and those from abroad. There are also places to park vehicles, stroll along boardwalks, hike, mountain bike and swim. Available to the public in the summer is a canteen, showers, flush toilets and a section of beach that is supervised by the Nova Scotia Lifeguard Service.

Parks
Lawrencetown Beach Provincial Park 

Background and history: Lawrencetown Beach is located in East Lawrencetown, Nova Scotia Canada along the 207 Hwy. All year around, surfers migrate to the area to catch that perfect wave! The beach has seasonal life guards, washroom facilities, canteen, boardwalks and parking.
Originally, access to Lawrencetown Beach was controlled by the MacDonald family and used to support their sand and gravel company and later became a Nova Scotia Provincial Park. For years Lawrencetown Beach attracted sun bathers and swimmers for a hot afternoon retreat from the cities of Halifax and Dartmouth, Nova Scotia.

Demographics
Total population 251
Total dwellings 83
Total land area 20.5987 km2

References

Eastern Shore Marine Drive
Civc Addressing Halifax Regional Municipality

Communities in Halifax, Nova Scotia
General Service Areas in Nova Scotia
Surfing locations in Canada